Commonwealth banknote-issuing institutions also British Empire Paper Currency Issuers comprises a list of public, private, state-owned banks and other government bodies and Currency Boards who issued legal tender: banknotes.

Africa

Biafra

Bank of Biafra

Botswana

Bank of Botswana

British Kaffraria

British Kaffrarian Bank
Kaffrarian Colonial Bank

British West Africa

West African Currency Board

Bulawayo

Bulawayo Administrator's Office

Cape of Good Hope

African Banking Corporation
Agricultural Bank of Queenstown
The Bank of Africa Limited
Bank of South Africa
Beaufort Bank
Cape Commercial Bank
Cape of Good Hope Bank (First)
Cape of Good Hope Bank (Second)
Colesberg Bank
Commercial Bank of Port Elizabeth
Fort Beaufort and Victoria Bank
Frontier Commercial and Agricultural Bank
George Divisional Bank
Graaf Reinet Bank
London and South African Bank
Malmesbury Agricultural and Commercial Bank
Montagu Bank
The National Bank of South Africa Limited
The Oriental Bank Corporation
Paarl Bank
Port Elizabeth Bank
Queenstown Bank
Somerset East Bank
South African Bank
South African Central Bank
The Standard Bank of British South Africa Limited
The Standard Bank of South Africa Limited
Stellenbosch Bank
Stellenbosch District Bank
Swellendam Bank
Wellington Bank
Western Province Bank
Worcester Commercial Bank

Cape Province

African Banking Corporation Limited
The Bank of Africa Limited
The National Bank of South Africa Limited
The Standard Bank of South Africa Limited

East Africa

East African Currency Board

East African Protectorate

Gambia

Central Bank of The Gambia

Ghana

Bank of Ghana

Gold Coast

Kenya

Central Bank of Kenya

Koffyfontein

Lagos Colony

African Banking Corporation Limited
The Bank of British West Africa Limited

Lesotho

Central Bank of Lesotho
Lesotho Monetary Authority

Mafeking

Siege of Mafeking

Malawi

Reserve Bank of Malawi

Mauritius

Bank of Mauritius
Colonial Bank of Mauritius Bourbon and Dependencies
Mauritius Bank
Mauritius Commercial Bank
The Oriental Bank Corporation

Military Authority in Tripolitania

Banknotes of the Military Authority in Tripolitania

Namibia

Bank of Namibia
Namibia Reserve Bank

Natal

African Banking Corporation Limited
The Bank of Africa Limited
Colonial Bank of Natal
Commercial and Agricultural Bank of Natal
Durban Bank
London and Natal Bank Limited
Natal Bank Limited
The Natal Bank Limited
The National Bank of South Africa Limited
The Oriental Bank Corporation
The Standard Bank of British South Africa Limited
The Standard Bank of South Africa Limited

New Griqualand

The Government of New Griqualand

Nigeria

Government of Nigeria
Central Bank of Nigeria

Orange Free State

African Banking Corporation Limited
Bank of Africa Limited
Bloemfontein Bank
Fauresmith Bank
The Government of the Orange Free State
The National Bank of the Orange Free State Limited
The National Bank of South Africa Limited
The Standard Bank of South Africa Limited

Orange River Colony

African Banking Corporation Limited
Bank of Africa Limited
The National Bank of the Orange River Colony Limited
The National Bank of South Africa Limited
The Standard Bank of South Africa Limited

Rhodesia

African Banking Corporation Limited
Bank of Africa Limited
Barclays Bank (Dominion, Colonial and Overseas)
The National Bank of South Africa Limited
Reserve Bank of Rhodesia
The Standard Bank of South Africa Limited

Rhodesia and Nyasaland

Bank of Rhodesia and Nyasaland

Saint Helena

Government of Saint Helena

Seychelles

Central Bank of Seychelles
Government of Seychelles
Republic of Seychelles
Seychelles Monetary Authority

Sierra Leone

Bank of Sierra Leone
Charles Heddle, Freetown
Commercial Bank of Sierra Leone

Somaliland

Bank of Somaliland

South Africa

South African Reserve Bank
Union of South Africa

South African Republic

Cape Commercial Bank
Cape of Good Hope Bank Limited
The Government of the South African Republic
The Netherlands Bank of South Africa
The Netherlands Bank and Credit Union of South Africa Limited
The Standard Bank of British South Africa Limited
The Standard Bank of South Africa Limited

South Sudan

The Bank of South Sudan

South West Africa

Barclays Bank (Dominion, Colonial and Overseas)
The Standard Bank of South Africa Limited
Swakopmund Bookshop
Volkskas Limited

Southern Rhodesia

Central Africa Currency Board
Southern Rhodesia Currency Board

Swaziland

Central Bank of Swaziland
Monetary Authority of Swaziland

Tanzania

Bank of Tanzania

Transvaal

African Banking Corporation
Bank of Africa Limited
Natal Bank Limited
The National Bank of South Africa Limited
The Netherlands Bank of South Africa
The Standard Bank of South Africa Limited

Uganda

Bank of Uganda

Upington

The Upington Border Scouts

Zambia

Bank of Zambia

Zanzibar

The Government of Zanzibar

Zimbabwe

Reserve Bank of Zimbabwe

Americas

Alberta

Anguilla

East Caribbean Currency Authority
Eastern Caribbean Central Bank

Antigua

Barclays Bank (Dominion, Colonial and Overseas)
Colonial Bank
East Caribbean Currency Authority
Royal Bank of Canada

Antigua and Barbuda

Eastern Caribbean Central Bank

Bahamas

The Bahamas Government
The Bank of Nassau
The Central Bank of The Bahamas
The Public Treasury, Nassau

Barbados

Barclays Bank (Dominion, Colonial and Overseas)
The Canadian Bank of Commerce
Central Bank of Barbados
Colonial Bank
The Government of Barbados
The Royal Bank of Canada

Belize

Central Bank of Belize
The Monetary Authority of Belize

Bermuda

The Bermuda Government
The Bermuda Monetary Authority

British Army Bills

British Caribbean Territories (Eastern Group)

The Currency Board of the British Caribbean Territories (Eastern Group)

British Columbia

British Guiana

The Government of British Guiana

British Honduras

The Government of British Honduras

Canada

Bank of Canada

Canadian banknote issuers

Cayman Islands

The Cayman Islands Monetary Authority

Connecticut

Delaware

Demarary and Essequibo

See British Guiana, current day Guyana.
Banknotes of Demarary and Essequibo

Dominica

Barclays Bank (Dominion, Colonial and Overseas)
Colonial Bank
East Caribbean Currency Authority
Eastern Caribbean Central Bank
The Royal Bank of Canada

East Caribbean States

East Caribbean Territories

East Caribbean Currency Authority (Issued as both a general issue and by each island).

Falkland Islands

The Government of the Falkland Islands

Fort Michilmackinac

Banknote of Fort Michilmackinac

Georgia

Grenada

Barclays Bank (Dominion, Colonial and Overseas)
Colonial Bank
East Caribbean Currency Authority
Eastern Caribbean Central Bank
The Royal Bank of Canada

Guyana

Bank of Guyana

Hudson's Bay Company

Jamaica

Bank of Jamaica (Trading bank)
Bank of Jamaica (Central bank)
The Bank of Nova Scotia
Barclays Bank (Dominion, Colonial and Overseas)
The Canadian Bank of Commerce
Colonial Bank
Island Treasury
London and Colonial Bank Limited
Planters' Bank
The Royal Bank of Canada

Jason Islands

Leeward Islands

The Government of the Leeward Islands

Lower Canada

Bank of Montreal

Manitoba

Maryland

Massachusetts

Montserrat

East Caribbean Currency Authority
Eastern Caribbean Central Bank

New Brunswick

Newfoundland

The Bank of British North America
Commercial Bank of Newfoundland suspended operations on 10 Dec 1894.
The Government of Newfoundland
Union Bank of Newfoundland suspended operations on 10 Dec 1894.

New Hampshire

New Jersey

New York

North Carolina

Nova Scotia

Ontario

Bank of Toronto

Pennsylvania

Prince Edward Island

Quebec

Bank of Montreal

Rhode Island

Saint Kitts (Saint Christopher)

Barclays Bank (Dominion, Colonial and Overseas)
Colonial Bank
The Royal Bank of Canada

Saint Kitts and Nevis

East Caribbean Currency Authority
Eastern Caribbean Central Bank

Saint Lucia

Barclays Bank (Dominion, Colonial and Overseas)
Colonial Bank
East Caribbean Currency Authority
Eastern Caribbean Central Bank
The Royal Bank of Canada

Saint Vincent and the Grenadines

Barclays Bank (Dominion, Colonial and Overseas)
Colonial Bank
East Caribbean Currency Authority
Eastern Caribbean Central Bank

Saskatchewan

South Carolina

Trinidad

Barclays Bank (Dominion, Colonial and Overseas)
The Canadian Bank of Commerce
Colonial Bank
The Royal Bank of Canada
The Union Bank of Halifax
West India Bank

Trinidad and Tobago

Central Bank of Trinidad and Tobago
The Government of Trinidad and Tobago

Virginia

Asia and the Far East

Bangladesh

Bangladesh Bank

Bengal Presidency

Bank of Bengal
Bank of Hindostan
Bank of Calcutta
Commercial Bank
Union Bank

Bombay Presidency

Bank of Bombay
Bank of Western India

British North Borneo

The British North Borneo Company
The Darvel Bay (Borneo) Tobacco Plantations Limited

Brunei

The Government of Brunei

Burma

The Burma Currency Board
The Government of India
The Military Administration of Burma

Ceylon

Central Bank of Ceylon
The General Treasury
The Government of Ceylon

Cocos (Keeling) Islands

Hong Kong

The Agra and United Service Bank Limited
The Asiatic Banking Corporation
The Bank of China
The Bank of Hindustan, China and Japan
The Chartered Bank
The Chartered Bank of India, Australia and China
The Chartered Mercantile Bank of India, London and China
The Government of Hongkong
The Hongkong and Shanghai Banking Corporation
The Mercantile Bank of India Limited
The Mercantile Bank Limited
The National Bank of China Limited
The Oriental Bank Corporation
The Standard Chartered Bank

India

Asiatic Bank
The Government of Hyderabad
The Government of India
The Reserve Bank of India

Johore

The Constantinople Estate

Madras Presidency

Bank of Madras
Madras Government Bank

Malaya

Board of Commissioners of Currency Malaya

Malaya and British Borneo

Board of Commissioners of Currency Malaya and British Borneo

Malaysia

Central Bank of Malaysia

Maldives

Maldives Monetary Authority

Pakistan

The Government of Pakistan
The State Bank of Pakistan

Palestine

The Palestine Currency Board

Perak

The Chartered Bank of India, Australia and China

Sarawak

The Government of Sarawak

Selangor

The Chartered Bank of India, Australia and China
Tong Hing Loong

Singapore

Board of Commissioners of Currency Singapore
Monetary Authority of Singapore

Sri Lanka

Central Bank of Ceylon
Central Bank of Sri Lanka

Straits Settlements

The Asiatic Banking Corporation
The Chartered Bank of India, Australia and China
The Chartered Mercantile Bank of India, London and China
The Government of the Straits Settlements
The Hongkong and Shanghai Banking Corporation
The New Oriental Bank Corporation Limited
North Western Bank of India
The Union Bank of Calcutta

Australia

Commonwealth Bank of Australia
Reserve Bank of Australia
Hutt River Province Principality

New South Wales

Queensland

Tasmania

Van Diemen's Land

Victoria

Independent State of Rainbow Creek

Western Australia

New Zealand

Bank of Aotearoa
Bank of Auckland
Bank of Australasia
Bank of New South Wales
Bank of New Zealand
Bank of Otago
Colonial Bank of Issue
Colonial Bank of New Zealand
Commercial Bank of Australia
Commercial Bank of New Zealand
National Bank of New Zealand
New Zealand Banking Company
Oriental Bank Corporation
Otago Banking Company
Union Bank of Australia

Chatham Islands

Chatham Islands Note Corporation

Cook Islands

Europe

Alderney

Alderney Commercial Bank

Cyprus

Central Bank of Cyprus
The Government of Cyprus
Republic of Cyprus

Gibraltar

Government of Gibraltar

Guernsey

The Guernsey Banking Company
The Guernsey Banking Company Limited
Guernsey Commercial Banking Company
Guernsey Commercial Banking Company Limited
The Southern District Banking Company
The States of Guernsey

Ionian Islands

Ionian Bank

Ireland

Central Bank of Ireland
Currency Commission Ireland
Currency Commission Irish Free State
The Munster and Leinster Bank Limited
Ulster Bank Ltd

Isle of Man

Castle Rushen
Douglas and Isle of Man Bank (Dumbell's)
Douglas and Isle of Man Bank (Holmes')
Dumbell's Banking Company Limited
Martins Bank Limited
Isle of Man Government

Jersey

Bible Christian Church
Bible Christian Society
The Esplanade
International Bank
Jersey Agricultural Association, Trinity Bank
Jersey Mercantile Union Bank
Masonic Temple Company Limited
Parish of Saint Brelade
Parish of Saint Peter
Parish of Trinity
Saint Clement's Parish Bank
Saint John's Bank
Saint Martin's Parish Bank
Saint Mary's Parochial Bank
Saint Peter's Parochial Bank
Saint Peter's Value Road
Saint Saviour's Bank
The States of Jersey
Town and Parish of Saint Helier
Town Vingtaine of Saint Helier
Vingtaine du Mont au Prêtre (see Vingtaine de Haut du Mont au Prêtre, Vingtaine de Bas du Mont au Prêtre)
Wesleyan Methodist Country Chapels Bank

Limerick

Limerick Soviet

Malta

The Anglo-Egyptian Banking Company Limited
Anglo-Maltese Bank
Bank of Malta
The Central Bank of Malta
The Government of Malta

United Kingdom

British Armed Forces
British Military Authority

England and Wales

Bank of England
The Bewdley Bank
The Black Sheep Company of Wales Limited
The Chief Treasury of Wales Limited

Scotland

Bank of Scotland
The Royal Bank of Scotland
Clydesdale Bank
The British Linen Bank
The Commercial Bank of Scotland
The National Bank of Scotland

Northern Ireland

Bank of Ireland
First Trust Bank
Northern Bank
Ulster Bank
The Provincial Bank of Ireland
The Belfast Banking Company

Pacific Islands

British Solomon Islands Protectorate

The Government of the British Solomon Islands Protectorate

Fanning Island

Fiji

Bank of New South Wales
Bank of New Zealand
Central Monetary Authority
Currency Board of Fiji
Decimal Currency Board
Fiji Banking and Commercial Company
Government of Fiji
Reserve Bank of Fiji

Gilbert and Ellice Islands

The Government of the Gilbert and Ellice Islands

New Guinea

New Hebrides

Banque de l'Indochine
Overseas Institution of Issue

Papua

Bank of New South Wales

Papua New Guinea

Bank of Papua New Guinea

Riviera Principality

Bank of Riviera

Solomon Islands

Central Bank of Solomon Islands
Solomon Islands Monetary Authority

Kingdom of Tonga

Government of Tonga
National Reserve Bank of Tonga

Vanuatu

Central Bank of Vanuatu
Reserve Bank of Vanuatu

Western Samoa

Bank of Western Samoa
Central Bank of Samoa
Monetary Board of Western Samoa

See also

 Sterling area
 List of British currencies
 Canadian banknote issuers
 South West African banknote issuers
 List of Commonwealth of Nations countries by GDP
 List of stock exchanges in the Commonwealth of Nations

References
 

Numismatics
Banknotes
Banknotes of Africa
Banknotes of Asia
Banknotes of the Caribbean
Banknotes of Europe
Banknotes of North America
Banknotes of Oceania
Banknotes of South America
British Empire
Central banks
Currencies of the British Empire
Currencies of the Commonwealth of Nations